Wallace County may refer to:

 Wallace County, New South Wales, Australia
 Wallace County, Kansas, United States
 Wallace County, New Zealand
 Wallace counties are U.S. counties which historically voted for George Wallace in one or more of his unsuccessful attempts to reach the U.S. presidency.

County name disambiguation pages